Narcís Julià Fontané (born 24 May 1963) is a Spanish retired footballer who played as a defender, and a current manager.

Playing career
Born in Girona, Catalonia, Julià was a Girona FC youth graduate, and was promoted to the first team at the age of just 16. In 1982, he joined Real Zaragoza, being initially assigned to the reserves in Tercera División.

Julià experienced two consecutive promotions with the B-side, and made his first team – and La Liga – debut on 2 February 1986, coming on as a second-half substitute for Dragi Kaličanin in a 6–0 home routing of Celta de Vigo. In July of that year, he was definitely promoted to the main squad.

Julià scored his first goal in the main category of Spanish football on 13 September 1986, netting his team's only in a 1–3 away loss against Real Madrid. He went on to appear regularly for the Aragonese side during the following campaigns, and announced his retirement in November 1993 mainly due to a serious knee injury.

Manager career
After retiring, Julià joined Zaragoza's staff; initially a manager of the youth sides, he was an assistant at both reserve and main squads. In 2001, he returned to Girona, being named director of football.

On 6 June 2003, however, Julià was named manager of the Albirrojos, with the side in Tercera División play-offs. After achieving promotion, he returned to his previous role.

In the 2004 summer Julià was appointed Víctor Fernández's assistant at F.C. Porto, and remained with the manager in his subsequent spell at Zaragoza. On 26 October 2009 he returned to Girona, taking over for sacked Cristóbal.

After narrowly avoiding relegation, Julià left the club and joined FC Barcelona's backroom staff.

Honours
Copa del Rey: 1985–86

References

External links

1963 births
Living people
Sportspeople from Girona
Spanish footballers
Footballers from Catalonia
Association football defenders
La Liga players
Segunda División players
Segunda División B players
Tercera División players
Girona FC players
Real Zaragoza B players
Racing de Ferrol footballers
Real Zaragoza players
Spanish football managers
Girona FC managers
Catalonia international footballers